The 2nd Canton of Saint-Avold is a French former administrative division, located in the arrondissement of Forbach, in the Moselle département (Lorraine région). It was disbanded following the French canton reorganisation which came into effect in March 2015. It had 21,046 inhabitants in 2012.

Composition 
The canton of Saint-Avold-2 comprised 6 communes:
Carling
Hombourg-Haut
L'Hôpital
Lachambre
Macheren
Saint-Avold (partly)

See also
Cantons of the Moselle department
Communes of the Moselle department

References

Former cantons of Moselle (department)
2015 disestablishments in France
States and territories disestablished in 2015